German submarine U-655 was a Type VIIC U-boat of Nazi Germany's Kriegsmarine during World War II. She was the first U-boat sunk in operation against the Arctic convoys.

Design

German Type VIIC submarines were preceded by the shorter Type VIIB submarines. U-655 had a displacement of  when at the surface and  while submerged. She had two shafts and two  propellers.

U-655 was fitted with five  torpedo tubes (four fitted at the bow and one at the stern), fourteen torpedoes, one  SK C/35 naval gun, 220 rounds, and a  C/30 anti-aircraft gun. The boat had a complement of between forty-four and sixty.

Service history

The submarine was laid down on 10 August 1940 at the Howaldtswerke yard at Hamburg, launched on 5 June 1941.

The submarine was commissioned on 11 August 1941 under the command of Kapitänleutnant Adolf Dumrese (13 Nov 1909 - 24 Mar 1942).

Attached to 6th U-boat Flotilla based at Kiel, U-655 completed her training period on 1 March 1942 and was assigned to front-line service, The submarine left Kiel on 11 March reaching Helgoland on 12 March. From there the submarine departed on the 15 March on her first operational patrol to form part of the Ziethen wolfpack consisting of U-655 plus U-209, U-376 and U-378 operating northwest of Tromso in the Norwegian and Barent seas against the homebound convoy QP 9.

On the evening of 24 March 1942, U-655 was spotted on the surface about 8.25 pm by the leading gunner on the forward four-inch gun of the minesweeper  beam on, about two to three cables (370 to 556 meters) away and about 10 degrees off the minesweeper's starboard bow, with no crew apparently manning the conning tower or deck. Upon being called by the officer of the watch the captain Lieutenant-Commander David Lampen immediately called for emergency full ahead and called 'Stand by to ram'. Sharpshooter had just begun to gather speed when she struck the submarine just behind the conning tower. The submarine turned rolled over due to the impact and bumped along the minesweeper's port side sinking as it disappeared astern and sank stern first south-east of Bear Island, in approximate position 73.00N, 21.00E. No trace of the submarine or her crew of 45 was found except for two lifebuoys and what may have been a canvas dinghy.

References

Bibliography

External links
The Type VIIC boat U-655

German Type VIIC submarines
1941 ships
Ships built in Hamburg
U-boats commissioned in 1941
U-boats sunk in 1942
U-boats sunk by British warships
U-boats sunk in collisions
World War II shipwrecks in the Arctic Ocean
World War II submarines of Germany
Maritime incidents in March 1942